Moussa Tambadou (born 25 August 1992) is a French Paralympic athlete who competes in long jump at international elite events, he is also a former shot putter. He is a World silver medalist in shot put and a three-time European medalist in long jump.

References

External links
 
 

1992 births
Living people
Athletes from Paris
Paralympic athletes of France
French male long jumpers
French male shot putters
Athletes (track and field) at the 2016 Summer Paralympics
Medalists at the World Para Athletics Championships
Medalists at the World Para Athletics European Championships
20th-century French people
21st-century French people